The enzyme scytalone dehydratase catalyzes the chemical reaction

scytalone  1,3,8-trihydroxynaphthalene + H2O

This enzyme belongs to the family of lyases, specifically the hydro-lyases, which cleave carbon-oxygen bonds.  The systematic name of this enzyme class is scytalone 7,8-hydro-lyase (1,3,8-trihydroxynaphthalene-forming). This enzyme is also called scytalone 7,8-hydro-lyase.

Structural studies

References

 
 
 

EC 4.2.1
Enzymes of known structure